The OTCM QX ADR 30 (OTCQX30) is a United States stock market index comprising the top 30 American depositary receipts (ADR) quoted on the over-the-counter OTCQX.

Component stocks
Effective January 5, 2019.

References

External links
 

Global stock market indices
OTC Markets Group